Cinqué Lee (born July 1966) is an American actor and filmmaker. He is the younger brother of filmmaker Spike Lee.
Lee has worked in number of different positions of his older brother's films, as a camera operator, video archivist and most notably as a co-screenwriter in the 1994 film Crooklyn. He also had small roles in School Daze (1988) and Oldboy (2013). As an actor, he appeared in the Jim Jarmusch-directed films Mystery Train (1989) and Coffee and Cigarettes (2003), and a number of other independent films.

Lee is also a filmmaker himself, directing, producing and writing the films Nowhere Fast (1997), Sink Like a Stone (2000, short film), UR4 Given (2004), Window on Your Present (2010) and Burn Out the Day (2010, co-directed with Sean Bohary).

References

External links

1966 births
Living people
Male actors from New York City
African-American male actors
African-American film directors
African-American film producers
African-American screenwriters
Screenwriters from New York (state)
American male film actors
Film producers from New York (state)
American male screenwriters
People from Brooklyn
Lee family (show business)
Film directors from New York City
21st-century African-American people
20th-century African-American people
African-American male writers